Guillermo Cervantes Vásquez (?, Peru – after 1922, possibly Ecuador or Peru) was a Peruvian captain and leader of the Peruvian army who formed the group of Veterans of Caquetá that fought in the 1911 La Pedrera Conflict against Colombia, better remembered for his insurrection in 1921 where he proclaimed the Third Federal State of Loreto, one of many attempts to transform Peru into a federal state.

Biography
Born in Peru, he entered the Peruvian Army, where he met future president Luis Miguel Sánchez Cerro, with whom he participated against an insurrection in Puno in 1915. As the handing of the Amazon Trapeze to Colombia became apparent, he became frustrated and adamantly opposed it.

Insurrection
The Leguía administration was unaware of the discontent of the people in Loreto, who were dissatisfied with the treaty to be signed with Colombia, and was thus beginning to have small conflicts both with the Colombian authorities and with the authorities of the Regional Government of Loreto. This time, as an infantry captain, Cervantes took command of the “Cazadores del Oriente” regiment stationed in Iquitos, declaring himself in absentia on August 5, 1921 and issuing a Manifesto signed by 19 junior officers and 7 Loretan citizens:

What began as a movement of patriotic protest against the government's incapable policy led to the founding and establishment of a Federal Amazonian State, with its own government, army and currency but without ignoring itself as part of Peru. When the conflict was inevitable, Cervantes' troops marched on two fronts: blocking the passage from La Libertad to San Martín and blocking access to the Ucayali river, which connects Pucallpa with Iquitos, the new capital of the Federal State.

Disappearance
By early 1922, the situation was unfavorable to the revolutionaries, and on January 13, Iquitos, the proclaimed capital, had been captured by Peruvian troops. A few days earlier, on January 9, Cervantes had escaped, intending to reach Ecuador. The revolution would be quickly ended around the same time, and the region enjoyed some stability until a war in 1932, and another insurrection in 1956.

See also
 Loretan Insurrection of 1896
 Juan Bustamante Dueñas
 Teodomiro Gutiérrez Cuevas

References

19th-century births
Peruvian military personnel